Sundaram Balachander (18 January 1927 – 13 April 1990) was an Indian veena player and filmmaker. He directed, produced, and also composed music for a few of his films. Balachander was awarded the Padma Bhushan in 1982. He died of a heart attack at the age of 63, while on a music tour of India.

Film career 
S Balachander was born to Sundaram Iyer and Parvathi alias Chellamma. Sunderam Iyer was a patron of Papanasam Sivan and many other musicians in Mylapore, Chennai.

Balachander began as a child artist in the Tamil film Seetha Kalyanam in 1934, in which many members of his family acted. Balachander himself acted as a child musician in Ravana's court, and his father V. Sundaram Iyer acted as Janaka, elder brother S. Rajam as Rama and elder sister S. Jayalakshmi as Seeta. This was followed by appearances in Rishyasringar (1941) and Araichimani (1942).

In 1948 Balachander directed the film En Kanavar. In 1954 he directed Andha Naal, a classic Tamil film noir thriller.

Swati Tirunal Dispute
S Balachander claimed that the composer Swati Tirunal was a figment of history's imagination, and he did not even exist. He accused Semmangudi Srinivasa Iyer of passing off his own compositions as Swati Tirunal's. Balachander also disputed Balamurali Krishna's claims of having invented new ragas.

S Balachander was actively involved in the Swati Tirunal dispute at the time of his death.

Awards 
1954 – Certificate of Merit for Best Feature Film in Tamil – Andha Naal
1956 – Certificate of Merit for Best Feature Film in Telugu – Edi Nijam
1982 – Sangeetha Kalasikhamani, by The Indian Fine Arts Society, Chennai.
1982 – Padmabhushan

Filmography

References

External links 
 
 
  - Mysskin tells about S. Balachander's film history.

1927 births
1990 deaths
20th-century Indian film directors
20th-century Indian musicians
Film directors from Tamil Nadu
Film producers from Tamil Nadu
People from Thanjavur district
Recipients of the Padma Bhushan in arts
Saraswati veena players
Tamil film directors
Tamil film producers
Tamil musicians
Recipients of the Sangeet Natak Akademi Award